Alejandro Calva (born May 31, 1968 Mexico City, Distrito Federal, Mexico), is a Mexican actor.

Filmography

Film roles

Television roles

References

External links 
 

1968 births
Mexican male film actors
Mexican male telenovela actors
Mexican male television actors
20th-century Mexican male actors
21st-century Mexican male actors
Living people
Male actors from Mexico City